Picea brachytyla is a species of conifer in the family Pinaceae. It is found in China and northeast India. It is threatened by habitat loss.

References

brachytyla
Endemic flora of China
Trees of China
Vulnerable flora of Asia
Taxonomy articles created by Polbot